Bulwark Stream is a meltwater stream from Koettlitz Glacier on the east side of The Bulwark, a mountain outlier south of Walcott Bay, Scott Coast in Antarctica. The stream flows north and then west, following the perimeter of The Bulwark to enter Trough Lake and the Alph River system. It was named by the New Zealand Geographic Board in 1994, in association with The Bulwark.

References
 

Rivers of Victoria Land
Scott Coast